Afra Saraçoğlu (born 2 December 1997) is a Turkish actress.

Life and career  
After the Ottoman Empire collapsed, her family were Turkish immigrants from Thessaloniki and Crete.

Television Career
She was cast in Öğretmen, an adaptation of Mr. Hiiragi's Homeroom, in which she has the leading role alongside İlker Kaleli and Ceren Moray. With Mert Ramazan Demir, she played together in youth series "Ögretmen" and "Yalı Çapkını", "Fazilet Hanım ve Kızları". In 2019, she played the role of Hayat in the TV series Kardeş Çocukları, alongside Nur Fettahoğlu and Mehmet Aslantuğ.

Web Series Career
With Çağatay Ulusoy, Selin Şekerci, she played in Blutv's period series "Yeşilçam" about old Turkish cinema.

Film Career
At the age of eighteen, her first role is in film "En Güzeli". With Özcan Deniz, Nurgül Yeşilçay, she played in "İkinci Şans". With Tolga Sarıtaş, she had leading role in romantic youth film "Kötü Çocuk". With Mert Yazıcıoğlu, Kerem Bürsin, she played in "İyi Oyun" about game players. She played in "Aşk Bu Mu" with Kubilay Aka.

Theatre Career
With Nurgül Yeşilçay, she performed in play "Bir Barda Bir Gece".

Filmography

Awards 

 Turkey Youth Awards: Best Supporting Actress
 45th Golden Butterfly Awards: Shining Star Award

References

External links
 

Actresses from Ankara
Turkish television actresses
Turkish film actresses
People from Ankara
Living people
1997 births
Golden Butterfly Award winners